The men's 10,000 metres event at the 2010 Asian Games was held at the Aoti Main Stadium, Guangzhou, China on 26 November 2010.

Schedule
All times are China Standard Time (UTC+08:00)

Records

Results
Legend
DNS — Did not start

References

Results

Athletics at the 2010 Asian Games
2010